Stefan Johansson (born  in Piteå) is a Swedish professional ice hockey defenceman currently playing in AIK of the Elitserien. Johansson has also played in Sweden's national junior team (U17). His youth team is Munksunds SSK.

References 
 

Living people
1988 births
AIK IF players
Swedish ice hockey defencemen
HV71 players
People from Piteå
Sportspeople from Norrbotten County